Holiday is a Christmas music by American guitarist Russ Freeman.  The album reached #5 on Billboard's Contemporary Jazz chart.
Russ Freeman also serves as leader and frontman  for the Rippingtons.

Track listing 
Carol of the Bells - 1:45
Faith - 4:33
O Come, All Ye Faithful - 1:05
Hark! The Herald Angels Sing - 2:58
God Rest Ye Merry Gentlemen - 4:15
Angels We Have Heard on High - 1:12
Hymne - 2:34
Holiday - 4:17
My Favorite Things - 4:15
Jesu, Joy of Man's Desiring - 3:05
Merry Christmas, Baby - 4:39
This Christmas - 4:10
Have Yourself a Merry Little Christmas - 3:06

Personnel
Russ Freeman - guitar, keyboards, bass, drums
Bob James - piano
Hilary James - piano
Jeff Kashiwa - saxophone
Steve Reid - percussion
Abraham Laboriel - bass
John Pattitucci - bass
Steve Bailey - bass
Lillian Tynes - vocals
Bridgette Bryant - vocals
Jerry Hey - trumpet, flugelhorn
Gary Grant - trumpet, flugelhorn

References
Russ Freeman-Holiday at AllMusic

External links
 The Rippingtons Official site
 Russ Freeman on YouTube

1995 albums
1995 Christmas albums
Russ Freeman (guitarist) albums
GRP Records albums
Christmas albums by American artists
Jazz Christmas albums